Boubacar Sylla (born 17 April 1991) is a Malian football defender.

Career 
Sylla started his career in his home city of Bamako with Stade Malien during the 2008–09 season.

He joined French Ligue 2 side Châteauroux in the summer of 2009, but mostly featured in the reserve side during his first two seasons at the club. He made his professional debut in the 1–0 win against Sedan on 20 May 2011, and kept his place in the team for the following match away at Istres. He went on to make three further first-team appearances during the first half of the 2011–12 season.

On 30 January 2012, it was announced that Sylla had joined Championnat National side Cherbourg on a six-month loan deal, along with Jonathan Kodjia of Reims. Sylla indicated that he hoped to gain from the experience of playing at a lower level.

In September 2012 Sylla joined to the reserve team of RC Lens. He played during the CFA Season 2012–2013 in twelve games for RC Lens B. On 10 October 2013, Sylla signed a professional two-year contract with Lens.

References

External links

 

1991 births
Living people
Sportspeople from Bamako
Malian footballers
Mali international footballers
Mali under-20 international footballers
Malian expatriate footballers
Association football defenders
Stade Malien players
LB Châteauroux players
AS Cherbourg Football players
RC Lens players
Ligue 2 players
Expatriate footballers in France
21st-century Malian people